Spring Creek is a tributary of White Deer Hole Creek in Lycoming County and Union County, in Pennsylvania, in the United States. The creek is not designated as an impaired waterbody. The area in its vicinity was settled by 1787 and a mill was constructed on it in 1842. A number of bridges have been constructed over the creek. Its drainage basin is designated as a Trout Stocked Fishery and a Migratory Fishery.

Course

Spring Creek begins on the base of North White Deer Ridge in Washington Township, Lycoming County. It flows southeast for several tenths of a mile before turning east-northeast for several tenths of a mile, crossing Pennsylvania Route 554 and receiving two unnamed tributaries from the left. The creek then gradually turns southeast, receiving two more unnamed tributaries from the left and passing through a small pond. It then receives a very short unnamed tributary from the right before turning east-northeast. After a few tenths of a mile, it receives an unnamed tributary from the left and heads in a mostly south-southeasterly direction for a few miles, receiving two unnamed tributaries from the left and two from the right. The creek then turns east for several tenths of a mile, exiting Washington Township and Lycoming County and entering Gregg Township, Union County. Here, the creek meanders east-southeast for a few miles, receiving two unnamed tributaries from the left and two from he right before crossing Pennsylvania Route 44 and reaching its confluence with White Deer Hole Creek.

Hydrology
Spring Creek is not designated as an impaired waterbody. The creek's watershed is a USDA/NRCS priority watershed in Lycoming County.

Geography and geology

Watershed
The mouth of the stream is in the United States Geological Survey quadrangle of Allenwood. However, its source is in the quadrangle of Williamsport. The stream also passes through the quadrangle of Montoursville South. Its mouth is located within  of Spring Garden.

History
Spring Creek was entered into the Geographic Names Information System on August 2, 1979. Its identifier in the Geographic Names Information System is 1188221.

Historically, an Indian path followed Spring Creek from its mouth to its source and then over Bald Eagle Mountain, to Lycoming Creek, and beyond. In 1787, two of the fourteen families of White settlers in the White Deer Hole Valley were located on Spring Creek.

Isaac Hains built the fifth mill in Washington Township, Lycoming County on Spring Creek. The Spring Creek church was established on Mill Road near Spring Creek on January 7, 1877.

A prestresed box beam or girders bridge carrying State Route 2001 across Spring Creek was constructed in 1959 and repaired in 2011.

Biology
The drainage basin of Spring Creek is designated as a Trout Stocked Fishery and a Migratory Fishery. The creek has been described as providing "excellent" opportunities for angling.

See also
Beartrap Hollow, next tributary of White Deer Hole Creek going upstream
List of rivers of Pennsylvania

References

Rivers of Union County, Pennsylvania
Rivers of Lycoming County, Pennsylvania
Tributaries of the West Branch Susquehanna River
Rivers of Pennsylvania